Lauf is a municipality in the district of Ortenau in Western Baden-Württemberg, Germany.

Lauf is situated on the western edge of the Black Forest (Schwarzwald), located in a valley (Laufbachtal) that slopes roughly east–west.  The Laufbach stream which gives Lauf its name rises on the north-west side of the Hornisgrinde, and descends rapidly past the Glashutte towards Lauf. In the Laufbachtal and side valleys, native vegetation flourishes, including orchids.

Vineyards are a major land-use, as the village has a good number of south-facing slopes. The local landscape consists of orchards, meadows and forest.

The population in July 2006 was 3,980 persons, compared to 900 in 1692.

The Lauf coat of arms shows a red goblet on a silver background; emerging from both sides of the cup are clusters of grapes with leaves.

Places to eat in Lauf: Rebstock (Hauptstraße), Linde (Schlossstraße)

Bar in Lauf: Rabenkeller (Hauptstraße opposite the town hall).

Places to stay:
Pension Hornenberg (Hornenbergstrasse)
Gasthaus zur Linde (Schlossstrasse)

References

Ortenaukreis